The 1922–23 Washington Huskies men's basketball team represented the University of Washington for the  NCAA college basketball season. Led by third-year head coach Hec Edmundson, the Huskies were members of the Pacific Coast Conference and played their home games on campus in Seattle, Washington.

Washington tied with Idaho in the North, so they met in a playoff game in Spokane, which the Vandals  Born and raised in Moscow, Edmundson was a UI alumnus and former head coach. California and Stanford tied for the Southern Division title, but since the Golden Bears had won three of four in the season series, the Cardinals opted out of a playoff and ceded the title.

Postseason result

|-
!colspan=5 style=| PCC Northern Division Playoff

References

External links
Sports Reference – Washington Huskies: 1922–23 basketball season
Washington Huskies men's basketball media guide (2009–10) – History

Washington Huskies men's basketball seasons
Washington Huskies
Washington
Washington